Joseph William Goyder (1 July 1907 – 12 February 1986) was an English boxer who competed for Great Britain in the 1928 Summer Olympics. He was born and died in London. He fought as Joe Goyder.

At the 1928 Summer Olympics, he was eliminated in the first round of the heavyweight class after losing his bout to Sam Olij. Two years later at the 1930 Empire Games, he won the gold medal in the light heavyweight class after winning the final against Al Pitcher of Canada.

Goyder won the Amateur Boxing Association 1929 and 1932 light heavyweight title, when boxing out of the Old Goldsmiths ABC and City Police respectively.

References

External links
profile
 http://www.gbrathletics.com/commonwealth/boxing.htm
 http://amateur-boxing.strefa.pl/Championships/CommonwealthGames1930.pdf

1907 births
1986 deaths
Boxers from Greater London
English male boxers
Light-heavyweight boxers
Heavyweight boxers
Olympic boxers of Great Britain
Boxers at the 1928 Summer Olympics
Boxers at the 1930 British Empire Games
Commonwealth Games gold medallists for England
Commonwealth Games medallists in boxing
Medallists at the 1930 British Empire Games